The Bloomington Bloomers were a minor League baseball franchise based in Bloomington, Illinois that played between 1889 and 1939. They were affiliates of the St. Louis Cardinals (1935), Cleveland Indians (1938) and  Chicago Cubs (1939). They played primarily in the Illinois-Iowa-Indiana League during their existence. Their home park was Fans Field. Baseball Hall of Fame Inductees Burleigh Grimes and Clark Griffith played for Bloomington.

League championships
In 1903, they won the league championship under manager William Connors. They won back-to-back league championships in 1919 and 1920 under the guidance of Joe Dunn. Their final league championship came in 1935, under manager and future Hall of Famer Burleigh Grimes.

The ballpark
In the seasons of play from 1901-1939, Bloomington played at Fans Field, located at 109 E. Lafayette Street. Today, the site still has baseball fields as part of the City of Bloomington Park and Recreation system. It is now known as RT Dunn Fields.

Notable alumni

Baseball Hall of Fame alumni
 Clark Griffith (1888)  Inducted, 1946
 Burleigh Grimes (1935, MGR) Inducted, 1964

Notable alumni

 Hal Peck (1939)
 Johnny Schmitz (1939) 2x MLB All-Star
 Jack Hallett (1938)
 Blix Donnelly (1937) 
 Xavier Rescigno (1937)
 Bill Cox (1935)
 Howie Krist (1935) 
 Max Macon (1935)
 Hersh Martin (1935) MLB All-Star
 Howard Maple (1930–31) 
 Hy Vandenberg (1930–31)
 Bruce Campbell (baseball) (1930)
 Jack Tobin (1930) 
 Tommy Thompson (1929)
 Boom-Boom Beck (1925)
 Phil Collins (1924)
 Mack Allison (1922)
 Bob Fothergill (1920) 
 Paul Zahniser (1920)
 Butch Henline (1919) 
 Heinie Sand (1919)
 Don Marion (1916–17)
 Elam Vangilder (1917)
 Jim Bluejacket (1912–14, 1916)
 Ray Schmandt (1915–16)
 Harry Bay (1912) 2× AL Stolen Base Leader (1903, 1904)
 Les Nunamaker (1910) 
 George Cutshaw (1908–09) 
 Bill Steen (1909)
 Art Wilson (1906–08) 
 George Moriarty (1902) 
 George Keefe (1900)
 Pop Dillon (1895)
 Alfred Lawson (1889) Aviation Pioneer
 Joe Farrell (1888)

References

External links
 Bloomington Bloomers - Pantagraph

Defunct minor league baseball teams
Defunct baseball teams in Illinois
Sports teams in Bloomington–Normal
Professional baseball teams in Illinois
St. Louis Cardinals minor league affiliates
Illinois-Indiana-Iowa League teams
Chicago Cubs minor league affiliates
Cleveland Guardians minor league affiliates
Baseball teams established in 1888
Baseball teams disestablished in 1939
1888 establishments in Illinois
1939 disestablishments in Illinois